= History's Memory =

- Author: Ellen Fitzpatrick
- Subject: Historiography, United States history
- Published: 2004 (Harvard University Press)
- Pages: 336
- ISBN: 9780674016057

History's Memory is a history book about historiography of United States history. It was written by Ellen Fitzpatrick and published by Harvard University Press in October 2004.
